Elisabeth Markus (15 December 1895 – 19 January 1970) was an Austrian stage, film and radio actress.

Selected filmography
 A Star Fell from Heaven (1934)
 Maria Ilona (1939)
 A Mother's Love (1939)
 Beloved World (1942)
 The Rainer Case (1942)
 Back Then (1943)
 I'll Carry You in My Arms (1943)
 Der Fall Molander (1945)
 Anni (1948)
 On Resonant Shores (1948)
 The Appeal to Conscience (1949)
 Sensation in San Remo (1951)
 Daughter of the Regiment (1953)
 Your Heart Is My Homeland (1953)
 The Witch (1954)
 When the Grapevines Bloom on the Danube (1965)
 Count Bobby, The Terror of The Wild West (1966)

References

External links
 

1895 births
1970 deaths
Austrian stage actresses
Austrian film actresses
Austrian silent film actresses
20th-century Austrian actresses
People from Wiener Neustadt-Land District
Burials at the Vienna Central Cemetery